The 1968 Northern Illinois Huskies football team represented Northern Illinois University as an independent during the 1968 NCAA College Division football season. Led by Howard Fletcher in his 13th and final season as head coach, the Huskies compiled a record of 2–8. Northern Illinois played home games at Huskie Stadium in DeKalb, Illinois.

Schedule

References

Northern Illinois
Northern Illinois Huskies football seasons
Northern Illinois Huskies football